Cornelius Thomas Young (July 28, 1908 – July 25, 1980) was a Wisconsin politician who served in the Wisconsin State Assembly from 1931 to 1938 and the Wisconsin State Senate from 1939 to 1942. He also worked as a lawyer for Wisconsin Electric.

Early life
Cornelius Thomas Young was born on July 28, 1908 in Milwaukee, Wisconsin. He graduated from St. John's Military Academy. He received his law degree from University of Wisconsin Law School in 1931 and practiced law.

Career
Young represented the old 1st District of the Wisconsin State Assembly from 1931 to 1938, where he served as speaker in 1933 and 1934. He represented the old 9th District of the Wisconsin State Senate from 1939 to 1942. He was also a delegate to the 1940 Democratic National Convention.

Young was appointed assistant legal counsel for Wisconsin Electric in 1942. He became the utility's legislative spokesperson and vice president in 1955. He retired in 1972.

Death
Young died of cancer on July 25, 1980 at St. Mary's Hospital in Milwaukee.

References

External links
 

Politicians from Milwaukee
University of Wisconsin Law School alumni
Wisconsin lawyers
Democratic Party Wisconsin state senators
1908 births
1980 deaths
20th-century American lawyers
20th-century American politicians
Lawyers from Milwaukee
Democratic Party members of the Wisconsin State Assembly